Taleh Sar may refer to:
 Taleh Sar, Rahimabad